Mallawa Arachchige Gamini Jayawickrama Perera, MP, is a Sri Lankan politician and a member of the 15th Parliament of Sri Lanka representing Kurunegala. He is currently the Cabinet Minister of Sustainable Development and Wildlife and Minister of Buddha Sasana. He was the former Cabinet Minister of Food Protection. He was elected as the chairman of ESCAP (Economic and Social Commission for Asia and the Pacific) in April 2016. He was also the Chairman of United National Party (UNP) and the former Cabinet Minister for Irrigation and Water Management.

Early life and education
Gamini was educated at Nalanda College, Colombo. He was a member of the college's first XI cricket team and captained the team in 1960.

References

 
 
 28th Battle of the Maroons - Nalanda Team

Sri Lankan Buddhists
1941 births
Living people
Alumni of Nalanda College, Colombo
Members of the 10th Parliament of Sri Lanka
Members of the 11th Parliament of Sri Lanka
Members of the 12th Parliament of Sri Lanka
Members of the 13th Parliament of Sri Lanka
Members of the 14th Parliament of Sri Lanka
Chief Ministers of North Western Province, Sri Lanka
Cabinet ministers of Sri Lanka
Sri Lankan planters
District ministers of Sri Lanka
Sinhalese politicians